Harry Paul Capon (18 December 1912, in Kenton, Suffolk – 24 November 1969) was a British author who wrote fiction in various genres. He also worked as an editor in three films for Maurice Elvey (1887–1967), as an administrator in film and TV productions and was the head of the Film Department of Independent Television News (1963–1967). He began writing science fiction in the early 1950s with the Antigeos trilogy, dealing with the discovery of a Counter-Earth, usually hidden behind the Sun. He also wrote about utopias, time travel, lost civilizations, alien invasion and Martians.

Series

The Other Side Trilogy
 The Other Side of the Sun (1950)
 The Other Half of the Planet (1952)
 Down to Earth (1954)

Novels
 Battered Caravanserai (1942)
 Brother Cain (1945)
 Hosts of Midian (1946)
 Dead Man's Chest (1947)
 The Murder of Jacob Canansay (1947)
 Fanfare for Shadows (1947)
 O Clouds Unfold (1948)
 Image of a Murder (1949)
 Toby Scuffel (1949)
 Threescore Years (1950)
 Delay of Doom (1950)
 No Time for Death (1951)
 Death at Shinglestrand (aka Murder at Shinglestrand) (1951)
 Death on a Wet Sunday (1952)
 In All Simplicity (1953)
 The World at Bay (1953)
 The Seventh Passenger (1953)
 Malice Domestic (1954)
 Phobos, the Robot Planet (aka Lost: A Moon) (1955)
 Thirty Days Hath September (1955)
 The Wanderbolt (1955)
 Margin of Terror (1955)
 Into the Tenth Millennium (1956)
 The Cave of Cornelius (aka The End of the Tunnel) (1959)
 Flight of Time (1960)
 Warriors' Moon (1960)
 The Kingdom of the Bulls (1961)
 Amongst Those Missing (1959)
 Lord of the Chariots (1962)
 The Golden Cloak (1962)
 Strangers on Forlorn (1969)
 Roman Gold (1968)
 The Final Refuge (1969)

Non-fiction

The Great Yarmouth Mystery (1965)

Selected filmography
 Road House (1934)
 The Clairvoyant (1935)
 Play Up the Band (1935)
 Heat Wave (1935)
 The Trojan Brothers (1946)

References

External links
 
 Authors : CAPON, PAUL : SFE : Science Fiction Encyclopedia
 
 FantasticFiction: Paul Capon

1969 deaths
1912 births
20th-century British novelists
20th-century English male writers
English children's writers
English male non-fiction writers
English male novelists
English science fiction writers